Thomas Studhalter (born 5 January 1969) is a Swiss former rower. He competed in the men's coxless pair event at the 1992 Summer Olympics.

References

External links
 

1969 births
Living people
Swiss male rowers
Olympic rowers of Switzerland
Rowers at the 1992 Summer Olympics
Sportspeople from the canton of Lucerne